Yazadanabad District is a district (bakhsh) in Zarand County, Kerman Province, Iran. At the 2006 census, its population was 15,936, in 3,783 families.  The District has one city: Yazdan Shahr (formerly called Yazdanabad). The District has two rural districts (dehestan): Siriz Rural District and Yazdanabad Rural District.

References 

Zarand County
Districts of Kerman Province